The Frudal Tunnel is a road tunnel along the Norwegian National Road 5 in the municipality of Sogndal in Vestland county, Norway. The  tunnel begins at the Frudalen farm, goes through the mountains under the Frudalsbreen glacier, and exits at the small Berge farm area. The tunnel was opened on 29 October 1994 to connect the Fjærland area to the rest of the region.

Prior to its opening in 1994, there was no way to get from Sogndal to Fjærland (in Balestrand) other than by driving from Sogndal to Leikanger and then taking a ferry to Fjærland—quite a long journey. The only road connection to Fjærland was via the Fjærland Tunnel to Jølster Municipality to the northwest (that tunnel was built in 1986). After the Frudal Tunnel was built, the people of Fjærland began discussing changes to the municipal borders. On 1 January 2000, the entire Fjærland area was transferred to Sogndal municipality.  On 1 January 2020, the municipalities of Balestrand and Sogndal (and Leikanger) were merged into one large Sogndal Municipality.

References 

Sogndal
Road tunnels in Vestland
1994 establishments in Norway